There are a number of military operations with names similar to Operation Hope.  They are, chronologically:

Operation Mount Hope III, 1988 US mission to capture a crashed Mi-24
Operation Provide Hope, 1992 US Navy humanitarian mission
Operation Restore Hope, 1992-3 US operation in Somalia
Operation Support Hope, 1994 US military relief mission
Operation Shining Hope, 1999 US humanitarian contribution to Operation Allied Harbour
Operation Omaid (Hope), 2010 ISAF/Afghan operation

It may also refer to:
Operation HOPE, Inc., an American non-profit organization providing economic education
Operation New Hope, an education program in Ladakh, India